James A. Flaherty (July 3, 1853 – January 2, 1937) was the sixth Supreme Knight of the Knights of Columbus, serving from September 1, 1909 to August 31, 1927.

Early life 
Flaherty was born on July 3, 1853 in Philadelphia, Pennsylvania to Irish immigrants. He graduated from the University of Pennsylvania Law School in the 1870s. Flaherty practiced law for sixty-two years in Philadelphia as a lawyer specializing in settlement cases in the Orphan Court.

Knights of Columbus 
In 1909 Flaherty was elected Supreme Knight of the Knights of Columbus and served in the position until he retired on August 31, 1927. During his term in office, the Knights of Columbus engaged in significant work helping U.S. servicemen during World War I and civilians in the aftermath of the war.  He received many honors for his work and that of the Knights, including the Croix de Guerre from the government of France.  He was also awarded a medal from Secretary of War Newton D. Baker.

Death 
Flaherty died from pneumonia at his home on the evening of January 2, 1937. He left three children.  A son, Joseph A. Flaherty O.S.A., was president of Villanova University from 1965 to 1967.

Gallery

References

External links 
 

Lawyers from Philadelphia
American Roman Catholics
American people of Irish descent
1853 births
1937 deaths
University of Pennsylvania Law School alumni
Pennsylvania lawyers
Supreme Knights of the Knights of Columbus
Deputy Supreme Knights of the Knights of Columbus